Jaroslav Kudrna (born 5 December 1975) is a Czech former professional ice hockey player.

Kudrna was drafted 142nd overall by the San Jose Sharks in the 1995 NHL Entry Draft.  Kudrna signed for the Sharks organization from HC Pardubice in 1996, but only managed to play seven games for the American Hockey League's Kentucky Thoroughblades before returning to Pardubice where he would spend the next seven seasons.  In 2004, Kudrna moved to HC Lasselsberger Plzeň for one season before moving to HC Oceláři Třinec.  In 2006, he moved to Russia and signed for Metallurg Magnitogorsk.

Career statistics

Regular season and playoffs

International

External links

1975 births
Czech ice hockey left wingers
Czech expatriate ice hockey players in Russia
Metallurg Magnitogorsk players
HC Dynamo Pardubice players
HC Plzeň players
HC Oceláři Třinec players
Kentucky Thoroughblades players
Living people
Penticton Panthers players
San Jose Sharks draft picks
Stadion Hradec Králové players
Sportspeople from Hradec Králové
HC Bílí Tygři Liberec players
Czech expatriate ice hockey players in Canada
Czech expatriate ice hockey players in the United States